Amy Jessica Castle (born April 2, 1990) is an American actress and internet personality. She is known for her role as Viki Vanderheusen on Passions, as the "Cuppycake Girl, and as a YouTube Partner under the channel "SandCastleInc."

Career
In February 1994, she sang The Cuppycake Song at 3 years old. She released an album called Balloons in  1995 to go along with the song. The original video went viral on the internet.

After that, she began studying acting at the age of 4, and signed with her manager and first agent in Fall of 1998. On her fifth audition, she landed the role of young Ally on the hit TV series Ally McBeal. During the show's second and third seasons she appeared in eight episodes. Since then, she has appeared in many other shows, including The Norm Show, Providence, Lizzie McGuire, Oliver Beene, Malcolm in the Middle, and Summerland.

In 2002, Castle won a Young Artist Award for "Best Performance In A Comedy Series - Guest Starring Young Actress" for her work on Lizzie McGuire in the episode "Just Like Lizzie". In the summer of 2007, Amy booked what is currently her largest role to date: A recurring part on the daytime drama Passions. She plays Viki, the niece of Harmony resident Esme Vanderheusen.

In 2009, Castle played Tara on General Hospital.

In 2010, she played Amy Dillard in the episode "Nevada vs Senator Harper" of The Defenders.

As of June 9, 2011, Amy was officially brought on as a YouTube Partner, and continues to upload videos regularly for her food and restaurant series, "What's Amy Eating?", under the YouTube name "SandCastleInc.".

Filmography
 1998–2000:  Ally McBeal as Young Ally  (7 episodes)
 1999: The Norm Show as Khali (1 episode)
 2001: Providence as Lisa (1 episode)
 2002: Lizzie McGuire as Andie Robinson (1 episode)
 2004: Malcolm in the Middle as Hayley (1 episode)
 2004: Oliver Beene as Bonnie (1 episode)
 2005: Summerland as Regan (1 episode)
 2007–08: Passions as Viki Vanderheusen (Role: August 20, 2007 — July 14, 2008)
 2009: General Hospital as Tara (Recurring)
 2010: The Defenders as Amy Dillard (Co-Star)

References

External links

cuppycake.com

1990 births
Living people
American child actresses
American television actresses
American child singers
American YouTubers
20th-century American singers
21st-century American singers
20th-century American actresses
21st-century American actresses